The St. Michael the Archangel Church or the Parish of St. Michael the Archangel is a religious building belonging to the Roman Catholic Church, located in Bishkek at 197 Vasileva Street near Bayat bazaar in the capital of Kyrgyzstan. Although there are three Catholic parishes and other meeting places in the nation, the building is considered the only Catholic church and the center of this Christian denomination in Kyrgyzstan.

To access the site you must take a bus from the Osh Bazaar. Masses are celebrated in English are held on Saturdays by the Society of Jesus. Its history goes back to 1969 when it was built by ethnic Germans who were forced to move to this area at the time of the Soviet deportations of Joseph Stalin in the 1930s and 1940s. The church was built as a one-story structure in order not to be visible among private houses. In 1981, it was decided to expand the building so they built a second floor to make room for more practitioners.

See also
St. Michael's Church
Roman Catholicism in Kyrgyzstan

References

Roman Catholic churches in Kyrgyzstan
Buildings and structures in Bishkek
Culture in Bishkek